Tim Liken (born 18 July 1977), also known by his stage name as Tim Deluxe, is a British DJ and producer. He is best known for the song "It Just Won't Do", which charted in many countries.

Biography
Deluxe grew up in North London and worked at Time Is Right Records at the age of 14 and debuted for Ministry of Sound as a DJ in replacement of CJ Mackintosh before he turned eighteen. In 1994, Deluxe met Omar Amidora, a graphic designer and Andy Lysandrou, the label owner of Boogie Beat. In a joint venture, they launched Ice Cream Records, a record label and released a number of EPs as R.I.P. Productions. In 1997, Amidora and Deluxe had a number 14 hit single on the UK Singles Chart with "RipGroove" under the name Double 99. In 2001, Deluxe pursued a solo career as a music producer, with "Sirens" as his debut single. The song was signed to Darren Emerson's record label Underwater Records. In 2002, Deluxe released his most successful single "It Just Won't Do", which features the vocals of singer-songwriter Sam Obernik. Alongside his production career, his deejaying had seen more success with gigs in the United Kingdom. In 2003, Deluxe released his debut studio album The Little Ginger Club Kid and held an exclusive residency in Ibiza. His second and third studio albums titled Ego Death and The Radicle were released in 2006 and 2015 respectively.

Discography

Studio albums

Charted singles

As himself

With Double 99

With Saffron Hill

With Africanism All Stars

Production credits

Notes

References

1977 births
Living people
English DJs
English electronic musicians
English record producers
Musicians from London
DJs from London
English house musicians
UK garage musicians
Electronic dance music DJs